Zeleneč is a municipality and village in Prague-East District in the Central Bohemian Region of the Czech Republic. It has about 3,100 inhabitants.

Administrative parts
The village of Mstětice is an administrative part of Zeleneč.

References

Villages in Prague-East District